Ipeúna is a municipality in the state of São Paulo in Brazil. The population is 7,687 (2020 est.) in an area of 190 km². The elevation is 635 m.

References

Municipalities in São Paulo (state)